Underworld is the ninth studio album by American progressive metal band Symphony X. It was released on July 24, 2015 through Nuclear Blast, and released in Japan on August 24. The album's first single, "Nevermore", premiered on May 22, 2015, followed by "Without You" on June 19. They were both officially released on July 22, 2015. The band's guitarist, founder and main songwriter, Michael Romeo, said he was against releasing separated tracks of the album, since it was written to be "a whole".

Composition and lyrical themes 
Commenting on whether the album would revisit elements from previous records while also exploring new sounds, guitarist and main songwriter Michael Romeo said:

On another opportunity, he also commented:

According to Romeo, not as many people enjoy concept records as they used to, but he expects to make an album "worth listening to as a whole record. It's what I love about great individual songs, but still an album experience."

The album is inspired by Dante's Inferno and Orpheus in the Underworld. While Romeo does not consider Underworld to be a concept album, he admits that there is a common theme:

The usage of the number three by Dante is also referenced in the album. The opening track, "Nevermore", has three syllables, a three-note melodic phrase, and its verses contain three references to three songs from the band's third album, The Divine Wings of Tragedy.

The album cover was created by Warren Flanagan. The art includes different symbols for each of the nine circles of hell mentioned in Dante's work.

Track listing

Personnel
Credits per album booklet:
Russell Allen − vocals
Michael Romeo − guitars
Michael Pinnella − keyboards
Michael LePond − bass
Jason Rullo – drums

Technical personnel
 Michael Romeo – production, recording and engineering
 Jens Bogren – mixing and mastering at Fascination Street
 Warren Flanagan and Milena Zdravkovic – artwork
 Patrick Zahorodniuk – graphic design
 Danny Sanchez – band photography
 Eric Rachel – guitar reamping at Trax East

Charts

References

Symphony X albums
2015 albums
Nuclear Blast albums